The Commission on Government Security, commonly known as the Wright Commission, was a bipartisan group established by a statute of the United States government in 1955 to investigate government policies with respect to secrecy. It was named for its chairman Loyd Wright, a former president of the American Bar Association, whom the Commission's 12 members elected to that position.

History
President Dwight D Eisenhower and the two houses of Congress each named four members. Those appointed by Vice President Richard Nixon on behalf of the Senate were Senators John C. Stennis and Norris Cotton, Loyd Wright, and Susan B. Riley, a Tennessee professor of education and the only woman. The Speaker of the House named Representatives William M. McCulloch and Francis E. Walter, James L. Noel Jr., a Texas attorney, and Edwin L. Mechem, former Governor of New Mexico. President Eisenhower named former Attorney General James P. McGranery, Franklin D. Murphy, chancellor of the University of Kansas, Assistant Secretary of Defense Carter L. Burgess, and Under Secretary of Commerce Louis S. Rothschild.

Senators Stennis and Hubert Humphrey authored the resolution that established the Commission. Representative Walter sponsored it in the House of Representatives.

The Commission called its report "the first complete and detailed study" of the government's restrictions on access to information and the prosecution of those found to violate those restrictions.

Its report made a distinction between offenses based in disloyalty and lapses in security:

Report
It noted:

Senator Daniel Moynihan summarized the Commission's report in 1997:

Notes

Wright Commission on Government Secrecy
United States government secrecy
United States national commissions
Reports of the United States government
United States documents
1955 establishments in the United States
1957 disestablishments in the United States
Public inquiries in the United States